Ainsworth is a surname with its origins in the Northwest of England.  The origin of the word Ainsworth is from the Anglo-Saxon word 'worth' meaning an 'Enclosure', 'Ain' probably having been someone's name..

There is a village called Ainsworth near Bolton.

Notable people
 Alf Ainsworth, (1913–1975), English football player
 Bob Ainsworth (born 1952), British politician and MP
 Charles Ainsworth (politician) (1874–1956), British businessman and politician
 Charles Ainsworth (footballer) (1885–1955), English footballer
 David M. Ainsworth (1954–2019), American farmer and politician
 Dylan Ainsworth (born 1992), Canadian football player
 Edgar Ainsworth (artist) (1905–1975), British artist
 Ellen Ainsworth, US Army Nurse Corps officer
 Gareth Ainsworth (born 1973), English football player
 Geoffrey Clough Ainsworth (1905–1998), English mycologist
 George Ainsworth (1878–1950), Australian meteorologist, explorer and public servant
 Harrison Ainsworth (1888–1965), British newspaper editor
 Henry Ainsworth (1571–1622), English nonconformist clergyman and scholar
 John C. Ainsworth (1822–1893), American pioneer businessman and steamboat owner in Oregon
 Kacey Ainsworth (born 1968), English actress
 Kathryn Ainsworth, Australian netball player
 Kurt Ainsworth (born 1978), American baseball player
 Leonard Ainsworth (born c. 1923), Australian businessman
 Laban Ainsworth (1757–1858), American clergyman and pastor
 Leonora Ainsworth (1894–1985), American screenwriter for silent movies
 Lexi Ainsworth (born 1992), American actress
 Lionel Ainsworth (born 1987), English footballer
 Lisa Ainsworth, American plant physiologist
 Mary Ainsworth (1913–1999), American-Canadian developmental psychologist
 Paul Ainsworth (born 1979), British chef
 Peter Ainsworth (Bolton MP) (1790–1870), British politician
 Peter Ainsworth (1956–2021), British politician
 Ralph Ainsworth (1875–1952), British major-general
 Robert Ainsworth (lexicographer) (1660–1743), English Latin lexicographer
 Roger Ainsworth (1951–2019), British engineer and academic
 Ron Ainsworth (1924–2000), Australian rugby league player
 Seymour Ainsworth (1821–1890), American businessman
 Sidney Ainsworth (1872–1922), British actor
 Stewart Ainsworth (born 1951), British archaeologist
 Walden L. Ainsworth (1886–1960), American admiral
 William Francis Ainsworth (1807–1896), English traveller and geographer, cousin to William Harrison
 William Harrison Ainsworth (1805–1882), English historical novelist

Fictional
 Cassandra Ainsworth, character in the television series Skins, portrayed by Hannah Murray

See also
 Ainsworth (disambiguation)

English toponymic surnames